Patrick Mario Knapp Schwarzenegger (born February 2, 1968) also known as Patrick Knapp, is an Austrian-American attorney, businessman, and investor based in Los Angeles, California.

Early life
Patrick Knapp Schwarzenegger was born in Munich, West Germany. He is the only child of Erika Knapp (died in 1999) and Meinhard Schwarzenegger, elder brother and only sibling of former California governor Arnold Schwarzenegger. On May 20, 1971, Patrick’s father Meinhard Schwarzenegger died in a car accident in Kitzbuehel, Austria, when Patrick was three years old. Patrick was raised by his mother and grandparents in Austria and Germany. In 1981 at age 13 he moved to Portugal, first to Beja, Alentejo, where he played football and after to Lisbon, Portugal, where he attended the German School of Lisbon. In 1987, Patrick graduated with the German Abitur High School diploma and then emigrated to the United States to attend college with the help of his uncle, Arnold Schwarzenegger.

Career 
In 1991, Knapp Schwarzenegger graduated from the University of California, Los Angeles with degrees in economics and political science and briefly worked for Congressman Lee H. Hamilton (D-Indiana), Chairman of the Foreign Affairs Committee.

Between 1992 and 1995 Knapp Schwarzenegger attended law school, graduating in May 1995 with a Juris Doctor from the University of Southern California School of Law. His legal experience includes work in the Sony Music legal department in New York under the helm of Tommy Mottola in 1994, and during his last year of law school Knapp Schwarzenegger worked at the Los Angeles District Attorney’s Office. That same year he was admitted to practice law in California and joined the Beverly Hills based entertainment law firm Bloom, Dekom & Hergott, currently known as Bloom, Hergott, Diemer, Rosenthal, Laviolette, Feldman, Schenkman and Goodman. His legal practice focuses on the transactional representation of TV and motion picture actors, writers, directors and producers. In 2003 Knapp Schwarzenegger became a partner at Bloom Hergott.

In 2017, Knapp Schwarzenegger served as an advisor to his uncle Governor Arnold Schwarzenegger on Season 8 of the Mark Burnett-produced NBC television show The New Celebrity Apprentice, with some of the other advisors being Tyra Banks, Warren Buffett, Jessica Alba, and Steve Ballmer. Knapp Schwarzenegger is also known to be active as investor and shareholder in various startup companies such as E-mobility innovator Kreisel Electric and the international award winning premium tequila brand Padre Azul.

Personal life 
In 1999, Knapp Schwarzenegger's mother Erika Knapp died following a two year battle with cancer. On April 30, 2005, Knapp Schwarzenegger married Bliss Ellis, a publicist and former model from Texas. The couple reside in Los Angeles with their four children: Valentina, Franziska, Leonardo, and Mario. In 2006 Knapp Schwarzenegger became a naturalized U.S. citizen. Before he gained his U.S. citizenship, he asked the Austrian government for the right to keep his Austrian citizenship, as they do not usually allow dual citizenship; his request was granted.

External links 

1968 births
21st-century American businesspeople
American investors
American people of Austrian descent
Businesspeople from Los Angeles
California lawyers
German emigrants to the United States
German people of Austrian descent
Living people
Naturalized citizens of the United States
Schwarzenegger family